Lollipop Loves Mr Mole is a British television sitcom written by Jimmy Perry and produced by ATV. Thirteen episodes were produced in two series of six and seven episodes respectively. The first episode was broadcast on 25 October 1971.

Synoposis

The domineering Maggie Robinson (Peggy Mount - the 'Lollipop' of the title) and her timid husband Reg aka 'Mr. Mole' (Hugh Lloyd) are a comically-mismatched couple living in Fulham, London (they married late in life, 'Lollipop' having had aged parents to look after and 'Mr. Mole' having waited for 'Miss Right'). Their domestic bliss is interrupted by the arrival from Africa of Reg's brother, the brash, workshy Bruce (Rex Garner) and his hypochrondriac wife Violet (Pat Coombs). The comedy revolves partly around Reg and Maggie's attempts to get Bruce employment. Another feature is Reg's sinus trouble (which prevents him fully appreciating his wife's cooking).

Guest stars included Gordon Jackson, Michael Bates, Michael Knowles, John Clegg, Bill Pertwee, Carmel McSharry and Erik Chitty. Producers were David Askey and later Shaun O'Riordan.

The second series featured an electronic instrumental theme tune (the first series had Mount and Lloyd singing a love duet). For the second series, the title was changed to Lollipop. A special vignette of the show was produced for a Christmas compilation in 1971.

A DVD has been released of the only two surviving episodes (the others having been presumed lost), "A Marked Man" and "Lollipop and the Two Bares". Although the two series were produced in colour, the surviving episodes are only available in monochrome.

Episode Guide

Series 1
 "Home to Roost" (first broadcast October 25, 1971)
 "Sweet Hearts" (November 1, 1971)
 "Love in Gloom" (November 8, 1971)
 "The Man in the Brown Coat" (November 15, 1971)
 "Doctor Fruit Cake" (November 22, 1971)
 "Somebody at the Door" (November 29, 1971)

Series 2
 "A Marked Man" (July 17, 1972)
 "On Safari" (July 24, 1972)
 "It's Only Natural Gas" (July 31, 1972)
 "My Fur Lady" (August 7, 1972)
 "Cock-a-Doodle-Don't" (August 14, 1972)
 "Lollipop and the Two Bares" (August 21, 1972)
 "Inspector Hardcastle Investigates" (September 4, 1972)

Main Cast 
Peggy Mount - Maggie Robinson 
Hugh Lloyd - Reg Robinson
Pat Coombs - Violet 
Rex Garner - Bruce
Sue Holderness - Receptionist 
Gordon Jackson - Dr McGregor
Michael Bates - Mr Christmas 
John Cazabon - Raincoat man
Erik Chitty - Dr English 
John Clegg - Taxi Driver 
Ivor Dean - Sir Humphrey Stevens
Tommy Godfrey - Fred
Eric Longworth - Secretary Crow
Len Lowe - Announcer
Victor Maddern - TV Man
Larry Martyn - Tramp
Carmel McSharry - Diana
Sue Nicholls - Gloria
Bill Pertwee - Nelson
John Savident - King Crow
Ann Way - Mrs Jackson

External links

1970s British sitcoms
1971 British television series debuts
1972 British television series endings
ITV sitcoms
English-language television shows
Television shows produced by Associated Television (ATV)